Rupat is an island in the Strait of Malacca, and forms part of Bengkalis Regency within Riau Province of Indonesia. It lies just off the eastern coast of Sumatra, across from Dumai city, from which it is separated by the Rupat Strait.  Its area is 1,490  km². With a population of 43,570 at the 2010 Census, the island is sparsely populated, with a population density of 29¼ per km². Rupat was one of thousands of abandoned islands, but now the population is growing year after year. It makes them expand the area for the settlement.

There is a proposal by the Malaysian government with Chinese financial backing to build a bridge from Melaka to Rupat and Dumai, to be called the Malacca Strait Bridge, though Jakarta seems to prefer to build the Sunda Strait Bridge first.

Raptor bird migration
Together with Sangihe Islands, Rupat Island is located in the East Asian-Australasian Flyway, a corridor used by Raptors for migration. 24 of the 56 kinds of Asian Raptors can be found in both locations. From September to November, up to 2,000 Raptors migrate into Rupat Island every day, while migration out happens from February to April.

References

Islands of Sumatra
Populated places in Indonesia